Sphodros fitchi is a species of purseweb spider in the family Atypidae. It is found in the USA.

References

Further reading

 
 
 

Atypidae
Spiders described in 1980
Spiders of North America